Zaza Pachulia (born Zaur Pachulia; February 10, 1984) is a Georgian professional basketball executive and former player who is a basketball operations consultant for the Golden State Warriors of the National Basketball Association (NBA). He won two NBA championships with the Warriors in 2017 and 2018. He has played for the Georgia national team, captaining them in multiple tournaments.

Professional career

Ülkerspor (1999–2003) 
Pachulia started playing basketball at an early age in Georgia. He was scouted and recruited by the Turkish professional team Ülkerspor when he was a teenager. He became a member of the Georgian junior national basketball team at a young age, leading them at various tournaments.

Orlando Magic (2003–2004)
Once he distinguished himself with Ülkerspor, Pachulia was drafted in the second round by the Orlando Magic during the 2003 NBA draft.

Milwaukee Bucks (2004–2005) 
After being selected in the 2004 expansion draft by the Charlotte Bobcats, Pachulia was traded to the Milwaukee Bucks, where he played the 2004–05 season. While with the Bucks, he averaged 6.2 points and 5.1 rebounds per game off the bench.

Atlanta Hawks (2005–2011) 

Pachulia signed a contract with the Atlanta Hawks in the 2005 off-season and became the Hawks' starting center, when he averaged 11.7 points and 7.9 rebounds per game during the 2005–06 season. He began as the starting center during the 2006–07 season but later came off the bench. An on-court altercation between the relatively obscure Pachulia and Celtics star Kevin Garnett led one writer to dub Pachulia "Balboa" after the lead character from the Rocky series of movies. Pachulia re-signed with the Hawks on July 13, 2009, agreeing to a multi-year contract.

Galatasaray (2011) 
During the 2011 NBA lockout, Pachulia signed with Galatasaray of the Turkish Basketball League.

Return to Atlanta (2011–2013) 
Pachulia returned to the Hawks in December 2011, playing with them until 2013.

Return to Milwaukee (2013–2015) 
On July 17, 2013, Pachulia signed with the Milwaukee Bucks. On March 20, 2015, he recorded 22 points and 21 rebounds in a 129–127 overtime loss to the Brooklyn Nets. His 21 rebounds included 18 offensive rebounds, which marked an NBA season high and a Bucks franchise record.

Dallas Mavericks (2015–2016) 
On July 9, 2015, Pachulia was traded to the Dallas Mavericks in exchange for a future second-round pick. He made his debut for the Mavericks in the team's season opener against the Phoenix Suns on October 28, recording a double-double with 10 points and 10 rebounds in a 111–95 win. On December 26, he recorded his 16th double-double of the season with 17 points and 12 rebounds against the Chicago Bulls, surpassing his 2014–15 season total. On January 12, 2016, he recorded his 20th double-double of the season, and the 100th in his career, with 14 points and 12 rebounds in a 110–107 overtime loss to the Cleveland Cavaliers. Later that month, he came within 14,227 votes of knocking out San Antonio Spurs small forward Kawhi Leonard for a starting spot on the West All-Star team for the 2016 NBA All-Star Game. On February 3, 2016, he recorded 10 points and 15 rebounds against the Miami Heat for his career-best 22nd double-double of the season. His previous best was 21 double-doubles, set with Atlanta in 2005–06.

Golden State Warriors (2016–2018)

2016–17 season 
On July 12, 2016, Pachulia signed with the Golden State Warriors. On December 22, 2016, he had a season-best game with 15 points and 14 rebounds in a 117–101 win over the Brooklyn Nets. Pachulia helped the Warriors finish the 2016–17 regular season with 67 wins. During Game 1 of the Western Conference Finals against the Spurs, he had an infamous closeout foot slide on Kawhi Leonard, which ruled out Leonard for the rest of the series and effectively ended San Antonio's season. While Pachulia denied that he intended to injure Leonard, he was instantly dubbed a villain by the public and media. The Warriors went on to win the NBA championship after defeating the Cavaliers 4–1 in the 2017 NBA Finals. Pachulia made history for Georgia by becoming the first player from the country to win an NBA Championship. The Warriors finished the playoffs with a 16–1 record, the best postseason winning percentage in NBA history.

2017–18 season 
On July 25, 2017, Pachulia re-signed with the Warriors. On December 30, 2017, he scored a season-best 17 points to go with eight rebounds and six assists in a 141–128 win over the Memphis Grizzlies.

In a game against the Thunder on February 25, 2018, Pachulia again caused controversy as he fell onto Russell Westbrook's knee after a play. Westbrook stated in an interview after the game that he believed Pachulia's fall was intentional with the intent of injuring his knee. Teammate Kevin Durant later defended Pachulia stating that he had gotten his feet tangled up with Nick Young in the incident, but Pachulia was criticized by many players, coaches and pundits such as Paul George, Kyrie Irving, Gregg Popovich, describing the incident as yet another in a long list of controversial dirty plays in Pachulia's career. The NBA officially stated that they would not discipline Pachulia over the incident. In June 2018, Pachulia won his second straight championship as a member of the Warriors, after they defeated the Cavaliers in a four-game sweep in the Finals.

Detroit Pistons (2018–2019) 
On July 15, 2018, Pachulia signed with the Detroit Pistons.

Post-playing career 
On August 29, 2019, Pachulia retired from playing and re-joined the Warriors as a front office consultant in their basketball operations department. He won his third NBA championship after the Warriors defeated the Boston Celtics in six games in the 2022 NBA Finals.

Personal life
Pachulia legally changed his first name from Zaur to Zaza. He and his wife, Tika, have two sons, Davit and Saba, and a daughter, Mariam. Beginning in 2004, Pachulia hosted annual free summer basketball camps for children in different locations throughout Georgia until 2016 when he established a basketball academy in his native Tbilisi.

In 2017, Pachulia received the Order of Honor from Republic of Georgia president Giorgi Margvelashvili. He also holds Turkish citizenship.

Career statistics

NBA

Regular season

|-
| style="text-align:left;"| 
| style="text-align:left;"| Orlando
| 59 || 2 || 11.3 || .389 || – || .644 || 2.9 || .2 || .4 || .2 || 3.3
|-
| style="text-align:left;"| 
| style="text-align:left;"| Milwaukee
| 74 || 4 || 18.9 || .452 || .000 || .746 || 5.1 || .8 || .6 || .5 || 6.2
|-
| style="text-align:left;"| 
| style="text-align:left;"| Atlanta
| 78 || 78 || 31.4 || .451 || .000 || .735 || 7.9 || 1.7 || 1.1 || .5 || 11.7
|-
| style="text-align:left;"| 
| style="text-align:left;"| Atlanta
| 72 || 47 || 28.1 || .474 || .000 || .786 || 6.9 || 1.5 || 1.1 || .5 || 12.2
|-
| style="text-align:left;"| 
| style="text-align:left;"| Atlanta
| 62 || 5 || 15.2 || .437 || .000 || .706 || 4.0 || .6 || .4 || .2 || 5.2
|-
| style="text-align:left;"| 
| style="text-align:left;"| Atlanta
| 77 || 26 || 19.1 || .497 || .000 || .709 || 5.7 || .7 || .5 || .3 || 6.2
|-
| style="text-align:left;"| 
| style="text-align:left;"| Atlanta
| 78 || 1 || 14.0 || .488 || .000 || .650 || 3.8 || .5 || .5 || .4 || 4.3
|-
| style="text-align:left;"| 
| style="text-align:left;"| Atlanta
| 79 || 7 || 15.7 || .461 || – || .754 || 4.2 || .7 || .4 || .3 || 4.4
|-
| style="text-align:left;"| 
| style="text-align:left;"| Atlanta
| 58 || 44 || 28.3 || .499 || – || .741 || 7.9 || 1.4 || .9 || .5 || 7.8
|-
| style="text-align:left;"| 
| style="text-align:left;"| Atlanta
| 52 || 15 || 21.8 || .473 || .000 || .757 || 6.5 || 1.5 || .7 || .2 || 5.9
|-
| style="text-align:left;"| 
| style="text-align:left;"| Milwaukee
| 53 || 43 || 25.0 || .427 || .000 || .846 || 6.3 || 2.6 || .8 || .3 || 7.7
|-
| style="text-align:left;"| 
| style="text-align:left;"| Milwaukee
| 73 || 45 || 23.7 || .454 || .000 || .788 || 6.8 || 2.4 || 1.1 || .3 || 8.3
|-
| style="text-align:left;"| 
| style="text-align:left;"| Dallas
| 76 || 69 || 26.4 || .454 || .000 || .768 || 9.4 || 1.7 || .8 || .3 || 8.6
|-
| style="text-align:left;background:#afe6ba;"| †
| style="text-align:left;"| Golden State
| 70 || 70 || 18.1 || .534 || .000 || .778 || 5.9 || 1.9 || .8 || .5 || 6.1
|-
| style="text-align:left;background:#afe6ba;"| †
| style="text-align:left;"| Golden State
| 69 || 57 || 14.1 || .564 || .000 || .806 || 4.7 || 1.6 || .6 || .2 || 5.4
|-
| style="text-align:left;"| 
| style="text-align:left;"| Detroit
| 68 || 3 || 12.9 || .440 || .000 || .782 || 3.9 || 1.3 || .5 || .3 || 3.9
|- class="sortbottom"
| style="text-align:center;" colspan="2"| Career
| 1,098 || 516 || 20.3 || .469 || .000 || .751 || 5.8 || 1.3 || .7 || .3 || 6.8

Playoffs

|-
| style="text-align:left;"| 2008
| style="text-align:left;"| Atlanta
| 7 || 0 || 15.0 || .280 || .000 || .714 || 2.9 || .3 || .3 || .0 || 4.1
|-
| style="text-align:left;"| 2009
| style="text-align:left;"| Atlanta
| 11 || 1 || 23.6 || .415 || – || .762 || 6.9 || .3 || .5 || .3 || 6.9
|-
| style="text-align:left;"| 2010
| style="text-align:left;"| Atlanta
| 11 || 0 || 14.6 || .514 || – || .625 || 3.5 || .3 || .2 || .6 || 4.6
|-
| style="text-align:left;"| 2011
| style="text-align:left;"| Atlanta
| 11 || 0 || 17.7 || .478 || – || .773 || 4.9 || 1.2 || .2 || .1 || 3.5
|-
| style="text-align:left;"| 2015
| style="text-align:left;"| Milwaukee
| 6 || 6 || 21.5 || .400 || – || .615 || 6.7 || 1.5 || 1.7 || .5 || 6.7
|-
| style="text-align:left;"| 2016
| style="text-align:left;"| Dallas
| 5 || 4 || 22.4 || .375 || – || .882 || 5.4 || 3.2 || .6 || .2 || 6.6
|-
| style="text-align:left;background:#afe6ba;"| 2017†
| style="text-align:left;"| Golden State
| 15 || 15 || 14.1 || .533 || .000 || .765 || 3.8 || .8 || .5 || .3 || 5.1
|-
| style="text-align:left;background:#afe6ba;"| 2018†
| style="text-align:left;"| Golden State
| 7 || 0 || 3.7 || .571 || – || .750 || 1.7 || .1 || .4 || .1 || 2.4
|- class="sortbottom"
| style="text-align:center;" colspan="2"| Career
| 73 || 26 || 16.4 || .446 || .000 || .738 || 4.4 || .8 || .5 || .3 || 5.0

EuroLeague

|-
| style="text-align:left;"| 2001–02
| style="text-align:left;"| Ülkerspor
| 13 || 1 || 7.4 || .536 || .000 || .733 || 1.8 || .2 || .3 || .1 || 3.2 || 3.7
|-
| style="text-align:left;"| 2002–03
| style="text-align:left;"| Ülkerspor
| 14 || 2 || 10.4 || .467 || .000 || .625 || 2.9 || .3 || .5 || .5 || 4.4 || 4.8
|-
| style="text-align:left;"| 2011–12
| style="text-align:left;"| Galatasaray
| 4 || 2 || 15.1 || .389 || .000 || .600 || 4.5 || .5 || .5 || .5 || 6.5 || 6.8
|- class="sortbottom"
| style="text-align:center;" colspan="2"| Career
| 31 || 5 || 10.0 || .473 || .000 || .642 || 2.6 || .3|| .4 || .1 || 4.2 || 4.6

National team
Source

See also

 List of European basketball players in the United States

References

External links

 Pachulia's official website
 Zaza Pachulia at euroleague.net

1984 births
Living people
Atlanta Hawks players
Centers (basketball)
Charlotte Bobcats expansion draft picks
Dallas Mavericks players
Detroit Pistons players
Expatriate basketball people from Georgia (country) in the United States
Expatriate basketball players in Turkey
Expatriate sportspeople from Georgia (country) in Turkey
Galatasaray S.K. (men's basketball) players
Golden State Warriors players
Men's basketball players from Georgia (country)
Milwaukee Bucks players
Mingrelians
National Basketball Association players from Georgia (country)
Orlando Magic draft picks
Orlando Magic players
Recipients of the Order of Honor (Georgia)
Basketball players from Tbilisi
Ülker G.S.K. basketball players